Subedar Prasad was an Indian politician belonging to the Bharatiya Janata Party.  He was elected to the Lok Sabha the lower house of Indian Parliament from Robertsganj in Uttar Pradesh in 1989.

References

External links
Official biographical sketch in Parliament of India website 

India MPs 1989–1991
Lok Sabha members from Uttar Pradesh
1935 births
Living people
Bharatiya Janata Party politicians from Uttar Pradesh
People from Sonbhadra district